The Bachelor is an American romance and relationship multimedia franchise which began with the reality television series The Bachelor in 2002 and now includes multiple spin-off television series, a podcast network, a website, live tour, and more.

The franchise has been financially successful, bringing in $86 million in advertising revenue alone in 2017.

Television series

The Bachelor (2002–present) 
The Bachelor revolves around a single bachelor who begins with a pool of romantic interests from whom he is expected to select a wife. During the course of the season, the bachelor goes on group and one-on-one dates to get to know the candidates, and eliminates some of them each week, eventually culminating in a marriage proposal to his final selection.

The Bachelorette (2003–present) 
Following the success of The Bachelor creator Mike Fleiss produced The Bachelorette, in which the format is gender-reversed. The bachelorettes are often eliminated contestants from The Bachelor. Season 11 of The Bachelorette had two bachelorettes (but only for the first episode). Season 16 had two bachelorettes (one for the first half of the season, the other the rest of the season). Season 19 had two bachelorettes for the whole season.

Bachelor Pad (2010–2012) 
Bachelor Pad premiered in August 2010, giving previous contestants of both The Bachelor and The Bachelorette an opportunity to compete in dating-themed eliminations for $250,000. This summer series lasted three seasons.

Bachelor in Paradise (2014–present) 
Bachelor in Paradise premiered on August 4, 2014, giving previous contestants of both The Bachelor and The Bachelorette the opportunity to compete for another chance in love in dating-themed eliminations.

Bachelor in Paradise: After Paradise (2015–2016) 
Bachelor in Paradise: After Paradise premiered on August 3, 2015 and was a live, weekly talk show that features cast of the series and celebrity fans discussing the most recent episodes of Bachelor in Paradise. The series also featured questions from the audience, deleted scenes, outtakes and exclusive extra content. The talk show was hosted by Michelle Collins and co-hosted by Sean Lowe.

Bachelor Live (2016) 
Bachelor Live premiered on January 4, 2016, and was a one-hour talk show hosted by Chris Harrison which aired directly after The Bachelor.

Ben and Lauren: Happily Ever After? (2016) 
First airing in October 2016 on Freeform, Ben and Lauren: Happily Ever After? showcased the relationship of Ben Higgins and Lauren Bushnell following season 20 of The Bachelor on their plans for marriage and Bushnell's new life in Denver. The couple eventually parted ways in May 15, 2017.

The Twins: Happily Ever After (2017) 
On March 20, 2017, The Twins: Happily Ever After premiered on Freeform. The series stars Haley and Emily Ferguson from season 20 of The Bachelor and showcases them "saying goodbye to the comfort and luxuries of living under their mom's roof and beginning the hilarious journey of figuring out life on their own while searching for independence and a new career."

The Bachelor: Winter Games (2018) 
The Bachelor Winter Games premiered on February 13, 2018. The show follows a similar premise to that of Bachelor in Paradise with a few twists. One stand out twist is that the cast is made up of international contestants from The Bachelor franchise. All contestants participate in various winter sports in order to win a date card. Ashley Iaconetti (American) and Kevin Wendt (Canadian) were the winning couple of the first season, after competing in an ice skating dance routine against three other couples.

The Bachelor Presents: Listen to Your Heart (2020)
The Bachelor Presents: Listen to Your Heart premiered on April 13, 2020. follows single men and women, who are musicians or work in the music industry, hoping to find love through music. The contestants will sing well-known songs, both individually and as couples, and explore their relationships while living together and going on Bachelor-style dates that focus on music.

The Bachelor: The Greatest Seasons – Ever! (2020) 
On April 29, 2020, a 10-episode documentary series titled The Bachelor: The Greatest Seasons – Ever! was announced. It premiered on June 8, 2020. It was originally titled The Bachelor: The Most Unforgettable—Ever! before its name was changed on May 11, 2020. The series contains recaps of previous seasons of The Bachelor and The Bachelorette and features interviews with former cast members. It is hosted by Chris Harrison.

Wedding Specials 
The weddings of Trista Rehn (the 1st Bachelorette), Jason Mesnick (13th Bachelor), Ashley Hebert (the 7th Bachelorette), and Sean Lowe (the 17th Bachelor) were broadcast as television specials. Rehn's vow-renewal ceremony upon her 10-year anniversary was also broadcast. Bachelor in Paradise season 2 couple Jade Roper and Tanner Tolbert's wedding was also broadcast as a television special in February 2016.

Upcoming Spin-offs 
In 2020, ABC announced plans to produce a summer counterpart of The Bachelor Winter Games, which would have presumably aired against the 2020 Summer Olympics (just as Winter Games aired against the Winter Olympics). On March 30, 2020, due to the COVID-19 pandemic (which itself caused the 2020 Olympics to be postponed to 2021), it was reported that production of the spin-off had been cancelled.

A casting call has been released by ABC for a version of the show featuring older contestants.

In other media

Live show 
The Bachelor Live On Stage was announced on January 23, 2019 during the Men Tell All episode. A local Bachelor would go through group date challenges and coveted one-on-ones with local ladies in the audience. Audience members and hosts would assist the Bachelor. Ben Higgins and Becca Kufrin are slated to host the 63 stop tour starting in Mesa, Arizona on February 13, 2020 with the final stop in Austin, Texas, was scheduled on May 17, 2020. However due to the COVID-19 pandemic, half of the shows have been postponed and they were rescheduled to January 24, 2021 in Cleveland, Ohio.

Podcast 
Bachelor Happy Hour is a podcast series hosted by Becca Kufrin and Michelle Young. It was originally hosted by Rachel Lindsay and Ali Fedotowsky. It premiered on July 19, 2020 and features weekly guests from various Bachelor Nation shows.

Website

Digital series 
The franchise has launched numerous digital series featuring cast members from the various television shows.

Meet and Greet 
One-on-one interviews with cast members not shown in the television shows.

Bachelor Happy Hour: Open Bar 
Expanded video version of the podcast Bachelor Happy Hour.

Bachelor Nation Encore 
Deleted and extended scenes not seen in the television show.

Will You Accept This Ride? 
Interview series where YouTube creator Lisa Schwartz interviews various cast members in the back of a limo.

Bad Chiller 
Comedic recap show featuring Nick Viall.

Video game 
The Bachelor: The Videogame was released in 2014 for Nintendo Wii and Nintendo DS. It gives players the opportunity to compete in a series of dates inspired by the television show.

Critical reaction to the game was negative.

International versions 

  An upcoming season
  No longer airing

The Bachelor 

Note:
 Reruns of the original American version are also broadcast in Australia on Nine Network.
 Originally, the Indonesian show, The Bachelor Indonesia was set to air on NET. based on The Bachelor, Warner Bros. Television deals with the format of the show in collaboration with distribution and production in Indonesia through PT Dunia Visitama Produksi, known under the name Fremantle for the Indonesian version. However, this show was canceled for an unknown reason. Finally, the show was confirmed to be aired on HBO Asia.

The Bachelorette

Bachelor in Paradise

Cultural impact 
Cast members featured on the show often gain a large social media following, which in turn creates various sponsorship and employment opportunities once they leave the show. In recent seasons some cast members have been accused of going on the show specifically for this reason, leading to accusations of "being here for the wrong reasons."

The various television series shoot on location in cities around the world, and promotion from these visits has been coined "The Bachelor Effect." Exposure on the shows has led to increased tourism and economic activity in the locations featured.

The franchise inspired the fictional show UnReal, which stars Shiri Appleby as a young reality television producer pushed by her unscrupulous boss (Constance Zimmer) to swallow her integrity and do anything it takes to drum up salacious show content.

References

External links 

 
Television franchises
Reality television series franchises